Saint-Justin is a commune in the Landes department in Nouvelle-Aquitaine in southwestern France.

History
In 1280, Constance Viscountess de Marsan signed an “acte de paréage” (a shared sovereignty agreement) with the Order of chivalry of the Hospitallers of St. John of Jerusalem, with which they founded the new Bastide of Saint-Justin. This agreement was signed without the authorization of Edward I, King of England, then Duke of Aquitaine.

Structure
The fortified town of Saint-Justin has the typical rectangular central square covered with arches and surrounded by half-timbered and stone houses with mullioned windows. Under the arcades, there are many shops, providing a walk for pedestrians and shelter from sun and rain. The town has three octagonal towers and a walkway along the ramparts and the tower wall.

Population

See also
Château de Fondat
Communes of the Landes department

References

Communes of Landes (department)